Robbins Island is one of the southwestern Joubin Islands, off the southwest coast of Anvers Island. It was named by the Advisory Committee on Antarctic Names (US-ACAN) for Stephen H. Robbins, Jr., an Able Seaman in the R.V. Hero in her first voyage to Antarctica in 1968.

See also 
 List of Antarctic and sub-Antarctic islands

References 

Islands of the Palmer Archipelago